Martin Gonzalez or Martín González may refer to:

People
Martín González (musician), Argentinian musician
Martín González (footballer) (born 1994), Uruguayan footballer
See also
Adolfo Martín González (1910–unknown), Spanish footballer
Alejandro Martín González (born 1973), Mexican boxer
Ángel Martín González (born 1964), Spanish footballer
Ángel Martín González (chess player) (born 1953), Spanish chess International Master
Marvin González (born 1982), Salvadoran footballer
Marwin González (born 1989), Venezuelan professional baseball player

Places
Martín González, Carolina, Puerto Rico, a barrio